Sherlock Yack (also known as Sherlock Yack: Zoo-Détective) is an animated television series in 52 episodes of 13 minutes, co-produced by Mondo TV France and ZDF Enterprises, with the participation of TF1 and ZDF, and adapted from the novels of Michel Amelin, illustrated by Ruth Christelle (a.k.a. Colonel Mustard). The airing of the series began on 4 May 2011 on TF1 in issuing TFOU, and since 22 December 2012.

Plot

Sherlock Yams is the zoo's manager as well as its detective. As soon as a crime is committed, he investigates with his young assistant, Archie. With his help, he finds suspects and clues, while also getting into wacky adventures along the way.

Characters

Main characters
 Sherlock Yack - Sherlock is the zoo detective, solving any mysteries that arise. Unlike Sherlock Holmes, he's a yak, and is terrible in playing bagpipes. He was once a student in a Shaolin-like Buddhist monastery led by an ancient vulture named Ball of Purity.
 Hermione - A young female stoat and Sherlock's apprentice. She helps him find clues, suspects, and proofs. She doesn't like bagpipes, especially when Sherlock plays them, and she sometimes finds the culprit before Sherlock. According to Sherlock, she is the daughter of his best friend.

Books
 Who blew up the flamingo? (Qui a explosé le flamant rose ?) (2006)
Michel Amelin, Colonel Moutarde
 Who strangled the tiger? (Qui a étranglé le tigre ?) (2006)
Michel Amelin, Colonel Moutarde
 Who trapped the penguin? (Qui a piégé le pingouin ?) (2006)
Michel Amelin, Colonel Moutarde
 Who hacked the white elephant? (Qui a saucissonné l'éléphant blanc ?) (2007)
Michel Amelin, Colonel Moutarde
 Who tied the python? (Qui a noué le python ?) (2007)
Michel Amelin, Colonel Moutarde
 Who zigugged the koala? (Qui a zigouillé le koala ?) (2007)
Michel Amelin, Colonel Moutarde
 Who liquidated the raccoon? (Qui a liquidé le raton laveur ?) (2007)
Michel Amelin, Colonel Moutarde

Episodes

Who Broke The Kangaroo's Hand?
 Main: Sherlock Yack and Hermione
 Victim: Kangaroo
 Suspects: Old Horse, Gorilla and Chihuahua
 Culprit: Gorilla
 Other: Elephant, Boa, Koala, Mrs. Hippo, Mr. Sloth, Howler Monkey, Dr. Beaky, Porcupine and Beaver
 Other Ball of Purity's Lesson: Ball of Purity

While he was training for the big boxing competition, Kangaroo broke his hand while hitting the punching bag which someone filled with horseshoes. Meanwhile, Hermione bought a car for Sherlock but he doesn't have his driving license.

 Ball of Purity's Lesson: Inside the car Ball of Purity asked Sherlock what should he do when they're driving on a suspended bridge over 12 thousand meter cliff. But Sherlock kept giving bad answers.

Who Knocked Out The Howling Monkey?
 Main: Sherlock Yack and Hermione
 Victim: Howler Monkey
 Suspects: Koala, Boa and Beaver
 Culprit: Koala
 Other: Dr. Beaky
 Other Ball of Purity's Lesson : Ball of Purity

Someone had enough of Howler Monkey playing his guitar and howling loudly, making the annoyed animal knock him out, resulting in a Howler Monkey that keep singing very nicely. As for Sherlock, he doesn't want to abandon his bagpipe, which was a gift from Ball of Purity but Hermione wants him to try some other kind of instruments.

 Ball of Purity's Lesson (Birthday): Instead of a lesson, Ball of Purity gives Sherlock a bagpipe.

Who Robbed The Seal?
 Main: Sherlock Yack and Hermione
 Victim: Seal
 Suspects: Pelican, Turtle and Piranha
 Culprit: Pelican and Piranha
 Other: Ball of Purity, Koala, Howler Monkey, Old Horse, Mrs. Hippo, Beaver, Elephant, Chihuahua, Gorilla, Porcupine and Boa

After a card night with Turtle and Pelican, where Seal usually wins by cheating, someone robs the bets (which are boxes of caviar) from the underwater chest. For this case Hermione used an electronic tool called DAVE for resolving the case, but the device proves to be almost completely useless.

 No Ball of Purity's Lesson

Who Tagged The Bird of Paradise?
 Main: Sherlock Yack and Hermione
 Victim: Bird of Paradise
 Suspects: Marabou, Hyena and Chameleon
 Culprit: Chameleon
 Other: Mrs. Hippo, Koala, Kangaroo, Beaver, Boa, Gorilla, Porcupine, Old Horse and Dr. Beaky
 Other Ball of Purity's Lesson: Ball of Purity and Three Mini Snakes

The Bird of Paradise is a self-centered artist, who only paints himself. When he opened the safe where he was keeping his painting inside, someone tagged his latest creation. Meanwhile, today is Hermione's birthday but, Sherlock seems to forget it, upsetting the little stoat.

 Ball of Purity's Lesson: Face to a vase, Sherlock Yack must be very careful to any trap hidden on any area. But overconfident, Sherlock will directly put his hand inside the jar, causing his hand to be attacked by leeches.

Who Painted The Ostrich?
 Main Characters: Sherlock Yack and Hermione
 Victim: Ostrich
 Suspects: Crane, Stork and Mrs. Hippo
 Culprit: Stork
 Other: Porcupine, Beaver, Mr. Sloth, Gorilla, Pelican and Koala
 Other Ball of Purity's Lesson: Ball of Purity

During the Miss Zoo election, one of the three contestants, the Ostrich, got her head painted green. As for Sherlock, by using the wrong shampoos, he ended up by getting pink hair. Shaving his hair could’ve been the solution... If he wasn't traumatized by one of Ball of Purity's test.

 Ball of Purity's Lesson: Ball of Purity shaved Sherlock's hair for his next test: Facing his friends looking at him with his bald head.

Who Plugged Up The Elephant's Trunk?
 Main Characters: Sherlock Yack and Hermione
 Victim: Elephant
 Suspects: Skunk, Gorilla and Sloths
 Culprit: Sloths
 Other: Seal, Tiger, Lion, Kangaroo, and Beaver
 Other Ball of Purity's Lesson: Ball of Purity

Tired of being sprayed with water by the elephant, someone plugged up his trunk with two bananas. Meanwhile, Hermione decided to put Sherlock's stuff away. But once it's done, Sherlock is unable to find any of the stuff he needs, even the phone that Hermione didn't even touch while she was organizing Sherlock's stuff.

 Ball of Purity's Lesson: Ball of Purity asked Sherlock to put away the vases. But he put them inside the closet his own way, completely into a mess. Which caused the vases to fall on Ball of Purity.

Who Poisoned The Cheetah?
 Main: Sherlock Yack and Hermione
 Victim: Cheetah
 Suspects: Lion, Tiger and Gazelle
 Culprit: Gazelle
 Other: Dr. Beaky, Stork, Crane, Mrs. Hippo, Porcupine, Gorilla and Kangaroo
 Other Ball of Purity's Lesson: Ball of Purity
 Ball of Purity's Lesson: Ball of Purity asks Sherlock to move a pile of wood logs to a nearby bush, but Sherlock instead moves the bush to the other side of the logs while Ball of Purity was meditating only for the bush to fall over.

Who Crushed The Panda?
 Main: Sherlock Yack and Hermione
 Victim: Chef Panda
 Suspects: Raccoon and Mr. Hippo
 Unsuspected Culprit: Mrs. Panda
 Other Characters: Gorilla, Kangaroo, Koala, Chihuahua, Old Horse, Dr. Beaky and Big Chef Panda
 Other Ball of Purity's Lesson: Ball of Purity

Someone cut a huge branch on purpose to crush Chef Panda's kitchen, getting his restaurant closed until further notice.

This will not be good for Sherlock who came to eat here with Hermione. But he will try to resist to hunger, thanks to Ball of Purity.

 Ball of Purity's Lesson: Sherlock has to spend a whole day without eating by staying inside a cabin. After he drinks the glass of lemonade given by Ball of Purity, he faints shortly after answering him how does he feel.

Who Bugged The Porcupine?
 Main: Sherlock Yack and Hermione
 Victim: Porcupine
 Suspects: Flamingo, Coyote and Dromedary
 Culprit: Flamingo
 Other Ball of Purity's Lesson: Ball of Purity
 Ball of Purity's Lesson: Sherlock Yack was meditating while the Fly buzzing around then he landed on Ball of Purity’s Nose. Sherlock tries to hit the fly but he accidentally hitted on Ball of Purity's Nose.

Who Wants To Fry The Piranha?
 Main: Sherlock Yack and Hermione
 Victim: Piranha
 Suspects: Seal, Pelican and Skunk
 Culprit: Pelican
 Other: Flamingo and Dr. Beaky
 Other Ball of Purity's Lesson: Ball of Purity and Mini Frog
 Ball of Purity's Lesson:

Who Made The Parrot Sneeze?
 Main: Sherlock Yack and Hermione
 Victim: Parrot
 Suspects: Mrs. Hippo, Myna and Bobcat
 Culprit: Myna
 Other: Dr. Beaky
 Other Ball of Purity's Lesson: Ball of Purity
 Ball of Purity's Lesson:

Who Vandalized The Vampire Bat?
 Main: Sherlock Yack and Hermione
 Victim: Vampire Bat
 Suspects: Mr. Hippo, Giraffe and Beaver
 Culprit: Giraffe
 Other: Gorilla (Mentioned) and Piranha (Mentioned)
 Other Ball of Purity's Lesson: Ball of Purity

Every night, the Vampire Bat was playing his guitar, causing trouble to the neighborhood that try to get some sleep, causing one of them to destroy the Vampire Bat's guitar for shutting those noises for good.

As for Hermione, she wish Sherlock would be a little emotional.

 Ball of Purity's lesson: After telling his emotional moment, Ball of Purity asked Sherlock to tell a moment that make his sad. But for Sherlock, the moment he wanted to make a chicken sandwich and that he didn't have chicken made him sad.

Who Broke The Crane's Voice?
 Main: Sherlock Yack, Hermione and Little Roo
 Victim: Crane
 Suspects: Pelican, Rockhopper and Lemur
 Culprit: Lemur
 Other: Dr. Beaky, Stork, Old Horse and Kangaroo
 Other Ball of Purity's Lesson: Ball of Purity and Baby Panda
 Ball of Purity's Lesson:

Who Blinded The Giraffe?
 Main: Sherlock Yack and Hermione
 Victim: Giraffe
 Suspects: Ostrich, Grizzly and Lion
 Culprit: Lion
 Other: Doctor Beaky, Elephant, Koala, Gorilla, Bird of Paradise, Boa and Mr. Hippo
 Other Ball of Purity's Lesson: Ball of Purity
 Ball of Purity's Lesson:

Who Cleaned Up The Warthog?
 Main: Sherlock Yack (Green, Blue, Red and White Brown) and Hermione
 Victim: Warthog
 Suspects: Marabou, Grizzly and Skunk
 Culprit: Grizzly
 Other: Ostrich (Green Run/Astonished Run), Elephant, Tiger, Baby Panda, Mrs. Panda, Turtle, Mr. Sloth and Polar Bear(mentioned)
 Other Ball of Purity's Lesson: Ball of Purity
 Ball of Purity's Lesson:

Who Glued Up The Orangutan? 
 Main: Sherlock Yack and Hermione
 Victim: Orangutan
 Suspects: Lemur, Kangaroo and Chameleon
 Culprit: Kangaroo and Chameleon
 Other: Chihuahua, Turtle, Elephant, Rockhopper, Dr. Beaky, Little Roo, Lynx, Guinea Pigs
 Other Ball of Purity's Lesson: Ball of Purity, Baby Panda and Little Croc
 Ball of Purity's Lesson:

Who Mugged The Boa? 
 Main: Sherlock Yack and Hermione
 Victim: Boa
 Suspects: Howler Monkey, Koala and Crane
 Culprit: Howler Monkey
 Other: Marabou, Chihuahua, Lion, Turtle, Hyena, Elephant, Ostrich, Coyote, Tiger, Cheetah, Mr. Hippo, Seal, Gorilla, Porcupine, Old Horse, Dromedary, Gorilla (Mask), Mrs. Hippo, Little Roo, Guinea Pigs, Dr. Beaky and Little Croc
 Other Ball of Purity's Lesson: Ball of Purity
 Ball of Purity's Lesson:

Who Harassed The Yak?
 Main: Sherlock Yack and Hermione
 Victim: Sherlock Yack
 Suspects: Beaver, Parrot and Tiger
 Culprit: Beaver
 Other: Raccoon, Skunk, Gorilla, Koala, Lion, Myna, Coyote and Warthog
 Other Ball of Purity's Lesson: Ball of Purity
 Ball of Purity's Lesson:

Who Sabotaged Mrs. Fennec's Machine?
 Main: Sherlock Yack and Hermione
 Victim: Mrs. Fennec and Hermione
 Suspects: Gazelle, Okapi, Flamingo, and Next Suspect
 Unsuspected Culprit: Mrs. Fennec
 Other: Old Horse, Gorilla, Bird of Paradise and Dr. Beaky
 Other Ball of Purity's Lesson: Ball of Purity
 Ball of Purity's Lesson:

Who Robbed The Baboon?
 Main: Sherlock Yack and Hermione
 Victim: Baboon
 Suspects: Turtle, Gorilla and Bobcat (DJ)
 Culprit: Turtle
 Other: Koala, Beaver and Ostrich
 Other Ball of Purity's Lesson: Ball of Purity
 Ball of Purity's Lesson:

Who Knocked Out Sherlock?
 Main: Hermione
 Victim: Sherlock Yack
 Suspects: Zebu, Okapi and Guinea Pigs
 Culprit: Guinea Pigs
 Other: Dr. Beaky and Turtle
 Other Ball of Purity's Lesson: Ball of Purity
 Ball of Purity's Lesson:

Who Robbed The Tapir?
 Main: Sherlock Yack and Hermione
 Victim: Tapir
 Suspects: Crocodile, Kangaroo, Pelican and Raccoon Speed
 Culprit: Crocodile
 Other: Gorilla, Howler Monkey, Tiger (Mentioned)
 Other Ball of Purity's Lesson: Ball of Purity
 Ball of Purity's Lesson:

Who Dented The Turtle?
 Main: Sherlock Yack and Hermione
 Victim: Turtle
 Suspects: Speedy Raccoon, Cheetah and Sloths (Mr. Sloth and Mrs. Sloth)
 Culprit: Cheetah
 Other: Elephant, Howler Monkey and Skunk
 Other Ball of Purity's Lesson: Ball of Purity
 Ball of Purity's Lesson:

Who Unstriped The Zebra?
 Main: Sherlock Yack and Hermione
 Victim: Zebra
 Suspects: Tiger, Okapi and Garter Snake
 Culprit: Okapi
 Other: Flamingo, Ostrich, Mrs. Hippo, Turtle, Pelican, Bird of Paradise, Skunk, Warthog, Parrot, Gorilla and Gazelle
 Other Ball of Purity's Lesson: Ball of Purity
 Ball of Purity's Lesson:

Who Chocked Up The Grizzly With Laughter?
 Main: Sherlock Yack and Kangaroo
 Victim: Grizzly
 Suspects: Parrot, Gorilla and Baboon
 Culprit: Baboon
 Other: Flamingo, Mrs. Hippo, Hermione, Gazelle, Dr. Beaky, Mrs. Panda, Guinea Pigs, Giraffe, Lynx, Warthog, Koala, Okapi, Elephant and Octopus
 Not Ball of Purity's Lesson

Who Mugged The Heron?
 Main: Sherlock Yack and Hermione
 Victim: Dr. Beaky
 Suspects: Stork, Ms. Guinea Pig and Old Horse
 Culprit: Ms. Guinea Pig
 Other: Gorilla and Lemur
 Other Ball of Purity's Lesson: Ball of Purity
 Ball of Purity's Lesson:

Who Knotted Up The Octopus?
 Main: Sherlock Yack and Hermione
 Victim: Octopus
 Suspects: Elephant, Vampire Bat and Ostrich
 Culprit: Ostrich
 Other: Chef Panda and Pelican
 Other Ball of Purity's Lesson: Ball of Purity 
 Ball of Purity's Lesson:

Who Blackmailed The Myna?
 Main Charasters: Sherlock Yack and Hermione
 Victim: Myna
 Suspects: Skunk, Rockhopper and Orangutan
 Culprit: Rockhopper
 Other Charasters: Turtle and Elephant
 Ball of Purity's Lesson Charasters: Ball of Purity 
 Ball of Purity's Lesson:

Who Trimmed The Peacock?
 Main: Sherlock Yack and Hermione
 Victim: Peacock
 Suspects: Crane, Skunk and Mrs. Hippo
 Culprit: Crane
 Other: Flamingo and Mrs. Fennec
 Other Ball of Purity's Lesson: Ball of Purity
 Ball of Purity's Lesson:

Who Soaped Up Mrs. Hippo?
 Main: Sherlock Yack and Hermione
 Victim: Mrs. Hippo
 Suspects: Bobcat, Warthog and Hyena
 Culprit: Hyena
 Other: Dr. Beaky, Giraffe, Gorilla and Little Roo
 Other Ball of Purity's Lesson: Ball of Purity, Baby Panda and Little Croc
 Ball of Purity's Lesson:

Who Ridiculed The Lion?
 Main: Sherlock Yack and Hermione
 Victim: Lion
 Suspects: Tiger, Cheetah and Bobcat
 Culprit: Tiger
 Other: Porcupine, Ostrich, Gorilla, Skunk, Mrs. Panda, Crane, Stork, Mrs. Sloth and Giraffe
 Other Ball of Purity's Lesson: Ball of Purity and Gazelle Ninja
 Ball of Purity's Lesson:

Who Graffitied Hermione?
 Main: Sherlock Yack, Hermione and Ostrich
 Victim: Hermione
 Suspects: Bird of Paradise, Baboon and Tiger
 Culprit: Baboon
 Other: Orangutan, Giraffe, Elephant, Mrs. Hippo, Crane and Octopus
 Other Ball of Purity's Lesson: Ball of Purity and Gazelle Ninja
 Ball of Purity's lesson:

Who Stuck The Gorilla in the Sand?
 Main: Sherlock Yack and Hermione
 Victim: Gorilla
 Suspects: Kangaroo, Crocodile and Porcupine
 Culprit: Porcupine
 Other: Gazelle, Turtle, Skunk, Grizzly, Guinea Pigs, Little Roo, Little Croc, Tiny Porcupine, Hyena, Mrs. Hippo, Lynx, Ostrich, Mrs. Fennec and Old Horse
 Other Ball of Purity's Lesson: Ball of Purity and Baby Panda
 Ball of Purity's Lesson:

Who Robbed The Crane?
 Main: Sherlock Yack, Hermione and Babelle
 Victim: Crane
 Suspects: Turtle, Mrs. Penguin and Octopus
 Culprit: Mrs. Penguin
 Other: Mrs. Hippo and Seal
 Other Ball of Purity's Lesson: Ball of Purity as Princess
 Ball of Purity's Lesson:

Who Made The Crocodile Cry?
 Main: Sherlock Yack and Hermione
 Victim: Crocodile
 Suspects: Kangaroo, Mr. Hippo and Porcupine
 Culprit: Porcupine
 Other: Chef Panda, Crane, Piranha and Howler Monkey
 Other Ball of Purity's Lesson: Ball of Purity
 Ball of Purity's Lesson:

Who Trunked The Elephant?
 Main: Sherlock Yack and Hermione
 Victim: Elephant
 Suspects: Baboon, Bobcat and Rockhopper
 Culprit: Bobcat
 Other: Mrs. Fennec, Mr. Unicorn, Brown Cow and UFO
 Other Ball of Purity's Lesson Charasters: Ball of Purity
 Ball of Purity's Lesson:

Who Painted The Skunk?
 Main: Sherlock Yack and Hermione
 Victim: Skunk
 Suspects: Mrs. Fennec, Next Suspect and Lemur
 Unsuspected Culprit: Hermione
 Other: Ostrich, Elephant, Gazelle, Okapi, Dr. Beaky, Parrot, Flamingo, Mrs. Hippo, Giraffe, Mrs. Panda, Baby Panda, Turtle (Pink Car), Kangaroo (Blue Car),Speedy Raccoon, Howler Monkey and Coyote
 Other Ball of Purity's Lesson: Ball of Purity
 Ball of Purity's Lesson: Sherlock was taught by his master Ball of Purity, the "age-old art of being indifferent with criticism". It is shown that his Master tries to teach him this lesson, telling his student to stay calm when criticized. Just when Sherlock says that he understands the meaning, Master Ball of Purity hits with a critic, what Sherlock doesn't take as well as expected from the Master.

Who Tied Up The Beaver?
 Main: Sherlock Yack and Hermione
 Victim: Beaver
 Suspects: Seal, Crocodile and Chef Panda
 Culprit: Seal
 Other: Grizzly, Okapi, Mrs. Panda, Giraffe, Chihuahua, Gorilla, Lemur, Ostrich, Skunk and Elephant
 Other Ball of Purity's Lesson: Ball of Purity
 Ball of Purity's Lesson:

Who Derailed The Guinea Pigs?
 Main: Sherlock Yack, Hermione and Ball of Purity
 Victim: Guinea Pigs
 Suspects: Old Horse, Turtle and Bobcat
 Culprit: Old Horse
 Other: Dr. Beaky
 Ball of Purity's Lesson: Final Lesson

Who Cooled Off The Piranha?
 Main: Sherlock Yack and Hermione
 Victim: Piranha
 Suspects: Stork, Gazelle and Mrs. Hippo
 Culprit: Mrs. Hippo
 Other: Porcupine, Turtle, Ostrich, Giraffe, Marabou, Gorilla, Kangaroo, Elephant, Tiger, Lion, and Grizzly
 Other Ball of Purity's Lesson: Ball of Purity
 Ball of Purity's Lesson:

Who Froze Up Mrs. Penguin?
 Main: Sherlock Yack and Hermione
 Victim: Mrs. Penguin
 Suspects: Marabou, Warthog and Bird of Paradise
 Culprit: Marabou
 Other: Crane, Dr. Beaky and Guinea Pigs
 Other Ball of Purity's Lesson: Ball of Purity
 Ball of Purity's Lesson (Christmas):

Who Smeared The Zebu?
 Main: Sherlock Yack and Hermione
 Victim: Zebu
 Suspects: Skunk, Boa and Porcupine (Blue)
 Culprit: Porcupine (Blue)
 Other: Marabou, Giraffe, Little Roo, Elephant, Grizzly, Mr. Hippo, Gorilla, Tiger, Rockhopper and Kangaroo
 Other Ball of Purity's Lesson Charasters: Ball of Purity
 Ball of Purity's Lesson:

Who Fooled The Hippopotamus?
 Main: Sherlock Yack and Hermione
 Victim: Mr. Hippo
 Suspects: Old Horse, Orangutan and Parrot
 Culprit: Orangutan
 Other: Dromedary, Mrs. Fennec and Bobcat
 Other Ball of Purity's Lesson: Ball of Purity
 Ball of Purity's Lesson:

Who Made Stork Fart?
 Main: Sherlock Yack and Hermione
 Victim: Stork
 Suspects: Grizzly, Pelican and Warthog
 Culprit: Grizzly
 Not Other
 Other Ball of Purity's Lesson: Ball of Purity
 Ball of Purity's Lesson:

Who Targeted The Tiger?
 Main: Sherlock Yack, Hermione and Dromedary
 Victim: Tiger
 Suspects: Zebu, Guinea Pigs, Seal and Ostrich (Not Suspect)
 Culprit: Zebu
 Other: Dr. Beaky, Flamingo, Mrs. Hippo and Giraffe
 Other Ball of Purity's Lesson: Ball of Purity, Baby Panda, Little Roo, Little Croc
 Ball of Purity's Lesson:

Who Busted The Bagpipes?
 Main: Sherlock Yack
 Victim: Sherlock Yack's Bagpipes
 Suspects: Boa, Hermione and Mr. Hippo
 Culprit: Boa
 Other: Flamingo
 Other Ball of Purity's Lesson Charasters: Ball of Purity and Baby Panda
 Ball of Purity's Lesson:

Who Cut Up The Rockhopper's Collection?
 Main: Sherlock Yack and Hermione
 Victim: Rockhopper
 Suspects: Gorilla, Chihuahua and Garter Snake
 Culprit: Garter Snake
 Not Other
 Other Ball of Purity's Lesson Charasters: Ball of Purity
 Ball of Purity's Lesson:

Who Sunk The Pelican?
 Main: Sherlock Yack and Hermione
 Victim: Pelican
 Suspects: Howler Monkey, Mrs. Panda and Penguin
 Culprit: Howler Monkey
 Other: Elephant and Octopus
 Other Ball of Purity's Lesson: Ball of Purity
 Ball of Purity's Lesson:

Who Cemented The Turtle?
 Main: Sherlock Yack and Hermione
 Victim: Turtle
 Suspects: Mrs. Sloth, Mrs. Panda and Peacock
 Culprit: Peacock
 Not Other
 Other Ball of Purity's Lesson: Ball of Purity
 Ball of Purity's Lesson:

Who Knocked Out Gorilla?
 Main: Sherlock Yack and Hermione
 Victim: Gorilla
 Suspects: Bird of Paradise, Next Suspect and Lion
 Unsuspected Culprit: Baboon
 Other: Howler Monkey, Turtle, Dr. Beaky, Chameleon, Kangaroo, Ostrich, Mrs. Hippo, Tiger and Chihuahua
 Other Ball of Purity's Lesson: Gazelle Ninja
 Ball of Purity's Lesson:

Who Kidnapped Hermione?
 Main: Sherlock Yack
 Victim: Hermione
 Suspects: Okapi, Kangaroo, Gorilla and Next Suspect
 Culprit: None
 Other: Grizzly, Gazelle, Skunk, Chef Panda, Mrs. Panda, Guinea Pigs, Tiger, Elephant, Lemur, Parrot, Peacock, Giraffe, Ostrich, Dromedary, Chameleon, Mrs. Fennec, Crane and Lion
 Other Ball of Purity's Lesson: Ball of Purity
 Ball of Purity's Lesson:

Who Psychedelicized Chameleon?
Main: Sherlock Yack and Hermione
Victim: Chameleon
Suspects: Bird of Paradise, Myna and Chihuahua
Culprit: Bird of Paradise, Myna and Chihuahua
Other: Dr. Beaky, Flamingo, Skunk, Zebra (Mentioned), Panther (Mentioned) and Lemur
Other Ball of Purity's Lesson: Ball of Purity
Ball of Purity's Lesson:

External links 

2010s French animated television series
2011 French television series debuts
French children's animated fantasy television series
French children's animated mystery television series
French flash animated television series